Ross Breen (born 11 June 1956) is a Canadian rugby union player. He played in two matches for the Canada national rugby union team in 1983 and 1987, including one match at the 1987 Rugby World Cup.

References

1956 births
Living people
Canadian rugby union players
Canada international rugby union players
Place of birth missing (living people)